Mónica Navarro (born October 30, 1968) is a Tango singer and actress from Buenos Aires, Argentina. She resides in Montevideo, Uruguay. Her album Calle was nominated Latin Grammy Awards of 2014 for Best Tango Album.

Biography

Discography

References

External links 
Mónica Navarro on Facebook

1968 births
Tango singers
Musicians from Montevideo
Musicians from Buenos Aires
Latin American music
Living people
Women in Latin music